The Venice Marathon (stylized as Venicemarathon) is a marathon road race that has been held each year in Venice since 1986, usually in October. The marathon is categorized as a Bronze Label Road Race by World Athletics.

History 
The course began in Stra and ended at Campo Santi Apostoli in Cannaregio.

The race had previously been sponsored by Casino di Venezia (Venice Casino), and was known as the Casino di Venezia Venice Marathon at the time.

In 2010, the competition celebrated its 25th anniversary.  That year it hosted the men's Italian marathon championships, which was won by Migidio Bourifa.

In 2011, the course included a section in Piazza San Marco for the first time.

In 2012, the organizers decided to reroute the course to bypass Piazza San Marco due to the high tide in Venice.

In 2017, the six leading runners lost about two minutes after mistakenly following a lead motorcycle for several hundred meters off the course about  into the race.  Race co-founder Enrico Jacomini explained that the lead vehicles had split off from the course as planned before it entered Venice, as it always does, since "Venice is not a city for cars or motorcycles".  Local runner Eyob Ghebrehiwet Faniel ended up winning the race by roughly two minutes, becoming the first Italian to win the marathon in 22 years.

In 2018, the high tide resulted in runners having to run through ankle-deep water, and forced organizers to drop Piazza San Marco from the course.  Strong winds and heavy rain only exacerbated the conditions.

In 2020, due to the coronavirus pandemic, organizers restricted the number of participants to three: a female ultramarathon champion, a male runner on the Venicemarathon Running Team, and a Paralympic champion.  All other registrants were automatically transferred to a virtual edition of the race, and given the option of transferring their entry to 2021 or 2022.

Course 

After leaving the bridge, the course heads toward the southern edge of the main island before running east along the Giudecca Canal and then crossing the Grand Canal at Punta della Dogana on a temporary pontoon bridge built specifically for the marathon.  Runners then make a small loop in Piazza San Marco, as long as the high tide permits, before continuing east along San Marco basin to finish at Riva dei Sette Martiri.

As the course runs over many small canals during the last few kilometers in Venice, wooden ramps are constructed over the small bridges to prevent runners from running on the bridge steps.

Other races 

A 10K covering the last segment of the marathon, from when the course leaves Parco San Giuliano (shortly before crossing Ponte della Libertà) to when the course finishes at Riva dei Sette Martiri, is held on the same day as the marathon.

Winners 

Since 2000, East African runners have dominated the elite races. Solomon Mutai of Uganda holds the men's record of 2:08:10 while Helena Kirop of Kenya is the women's holder with 2:23:37.

Key: 
 Course record

Notes

References

External links
Official website

Sport in Venice
Marathons in Italy
Recurring sporting events established in 1986
1986 establishments in Italy
Autumn events in Italy